Jane Eyre is a 2016 opera by Louis Karchin to a libretto by Diane Osen after the 1847 novel by Charlotte Brontë.

Roles
Jane Eyre – soprano
Mr Rochester – tenor
Roderick Ingram/St. John Rivers – baritone
Blanche Ingram – soprano
Diana Rivers/Mrs. Ingram – soprano
Mr. Mason/Mr. Briggs – baritone
Mr. Wood – bass

Recording
Jennifer Zetlan (Jane Eyre), Ryan MacPherson (Mr Rochester), Tom Meglioranza (Roderick Ingram / St. John Rivers), Katrina Thurman (Blanche Ingram), Jessica Thompson (Diana / Mrs. Ingram), Adam Cannedy (Mr. Mason / Mr. Briggs), David Salsbery Fry (Mr. Wood) Orchestra of the League of Composers, Louis Karchin, Naxos 2CD 2019

References

2016 operas
Operas based on Jane Eyre
English-language operas
Operas